"Give It a Lash Jack" is a song by Liam Harrison and the GOAL Celebrities. The song was made for Ireland's 1990 FIFA World Cup campaign.

It reached number one in the charts in May 1990 and stayed there for 2 non consecutive weeks. It was followed up in 1994 by "Give It A Lash Again".

In a 2011 interview on RTÉ Television, film director Jim Sheridan stated that Bono and himself agreed that "Give It A Lash Jack" was the "greatest Irish song ever written".

The song is sung in the Sky TV series Moone Boy, series 2 episode 1, which takes place during the 1990 World Cup.

References

External links
 Liam Harrison on Myspace

1990 songs
Cultural depictions of association football players
Liam Harrison (musician) songs
Republic of Ireland national football team songs
Republic of Ireland at the 1990 FIFA World Cup
Football songs and chants